Take Care of My Dad is a 2015 South Korean television program starring Lee Kyung-kyu, Kang Seok-woo, Cho Jae-hyun and Jo Min-ki. It airs on SBS on Sunday at 16:50 beginning April 21, 2015.

References

External links
 

2015 South Korean television series debuts
Korean-language television shows
Seoul Broadcasting System original programming
South Korean variety television shows
South Korean reality television series